Il sole nella pioggia is the eleventh studio album by Italian singer-songwriter Alice, released in 1989 on EMI Music.

Synopsis

The album, whose title translates as The Sun in the Rain, includes the single releases "Visioni" and "Il sole nella pioggia" as well as popular tracks like "Tempo senza tempo", "Le ragazze di Osaka" and the Friulian "Anìn a Grîs". Il sole nella pioggia features contributions from a number of international musicians who had previously collaborated with contemporary British artists in the alternative rock genre like Peter Hammill, Kate Bush and David Sylvian: drummer Steve Jansen and keyboardist Richard Barbieri – both former members of the band Japan, trumpeter Jon Hassell, guitarist Dave Gregory, guitarist and keyboardist Ian Maidman, Turkish flutist Kudsi Erguner as well as Italian jazz trumpeter Paolo Fresu.

"Le ragazze di Osaka" ("The Girls From Osaka") was originally recorded by the composer Eugenio Finardi and included on his 1983 album Dal blu, Finardi had previously written the track "Laura degli specchi" ("Laura of the Mirrors") for Alice, included on her 1982 album Azimut. The medieval French folk song and nursery rhyme "Orléans" (also known as "Le Carillon de Vendôme" or "Les Cloches De Vendôme") sung a cappella was originally arranged by David Crosby of Crosby, Stills, Nash & Young and included on his 1971 debut album If I Could Only Remember My Name. The acoustic "Anìn a Grîs", which translates as "Let's go hunt for crickets" in English, is based on a poem in the Friulian language by poet Maria Grazia Di Gleria, set to music by keyboardist Marco Liverani. Il sole nella pioggia closes with the English language track "Now and Forever", a duet with Peter Hammill of British progressive rock band Van der Graaf Generator.

Five of the tracks were written by Italian composer and singer Juri Camisasca, who also wrote "Nomadi" on the 1986 album Park Hotel.

The track "Cieli del nord" was a re-recording of "Le scogliere di Dover", first released on the Japanese compilation Kusamakura in 1988.

Track listing
Side A
"Il sole nella pioggia" (Juri Camisasca) – 5:08
"Cieli del nord" (Alice, Marco Liverani) – 4:51
"Visioni" (Juri Camisasca) – 4:38
"Tempo senza tempo" (Juri Camisasca) – 4:05
"Le ragazze di Osaka" (Francesco Messina, Eugenio Finardi, Luca Madonia) – 4:09

Side B
"Orléans" (Traditional, arranged by David Crosby) – 1:39
"Anìn a Grîs" (Maria Grazia Di Gleria, Marco Liverani) – 3:36
"L'era del mito" (Juri Camisasca) – 4:33
"Le baccanti" (Juri Camisasca) – 5:04
"Now and Forever" (duet with Peter Hammill) (Peter Hammill) – 5:05

Personnel
 Alice – vocals, percussion track B3
 Steve Jansen – drums tracks A1, A2, A3, A4, A5, percussion tracks A1, A5, B4, keyboards track A1, cymbals track B5
 Ian Maidman – bass guitar track A1, A4, A5, B4, B5 Prophet bass track A2, guitar solo track A4, keyboards & string arrangements track A5
 Richard Barbieri – keyboards & keyboard programming tracks A1, A2, A3, "Prophet V Guitar" track A3, keyboards tracks A4, A5, B2, B4, "Prophet V Guitar" solo track B3
 Jon Hassell – trumpet tracks A1, B4, keyboard activated sound (sampled trumpet) track A3
 Dave Gregory – guitars tracks A1, A3, bass track B2, 12-string and E-Bow solo guitar track B3
 Francesco Messina – keyboards & percussion programming track A1, keyboards tracks A3, A4, B1, keyboards & percussion track B3
 Marco Guarnerio – computer programming track A1, keyboards programming & guitars track A2, keyboards & computer programming track A3, acoustic guitar track B2, keyboards track B3
 Paolo Fresu – trumpets track A2
 Stefano Cerri – bass tracks A3, B2
 Marco Liverani – keyboards track A3
 Pino Pischerola – Sinewave sample tracks B1, B4, EMU III programming track B3
 Roberto Baldi – Prophet bass & keyboards track B3
 Nino Lali Piccoli – tablas solo track B3
 Franz Backmann – flügelhorn track B4
 Peter Hammill – voice, keyboards & arrangements track B5
 Kudsi Erguner – ney flute track B5

Production
 Francesco Messina – record producer
 Tim Kramer – sound engineer at Logic Studio, Milan, mix at Logic Studio (Tracks A1, A2, A3)
 Pino "Pinaxa" Pischetola – sound engineer at Logic Studio, mix at Logic Studio (Tracks B1 – B5), Audio File Digital Editing
 Antonio Baglio – sound engineer at Logic Studio, mix at Logic Studio (Track A5, re-edit)
 Alessandro Franchin – sound engineer at Condulmer Studio
 Marco Guarnerio – sound engineer at Condulmer Studio
 Steve Jansen – mix at Condulmer Studio (Tracks A4 & A5)
 Richard Barbieri – mix at Condulmer Studio (Tracks A4 & A5)
 Polystudio – artwork, design
 Sheila Rock – photography
 Alessandro Paderni – photography

Sources and external links
 discogs.com entry
 rateyourmusic.com entry
 allmusic.com entry

1989 albums
Alice (singer) albums
EMI Records albums
Italian-language albums
French-language albums